Sir Walter John George Verco  (18 January 1907 – 10 March 2001) was a long-serving officer of arms who served in many capacities at the College of Arms in London.

Biography
Walter John George Verco was born in London on 18 January 1907. He was educated at Tollington Park Central School.

In 1954 he was appointed Rouge Croix Pursuivant of Arms in Ordinary. He was on the Earl Marshal's staff for the funeral of King George VI in 1952, the Queen's coronation in 1953, the funeral of Sir Winston Churchill in 1965 and the Investiture of the Prince of Wales in 1969. He was also appointed Earl Marshal's Secretary in 1961. In 1960, Verco was promoted to Chester Herald of Arms in Ordinary. He was promoted to Norroy and Ulster King of Arms in 1971. He was appointed Surrey Herald Extraordinary in 1980, a post he held until May 1996. 

Verco was also Honorary Genealogist to the Royal Victorian Order.

Honours and appointments
Verco was appointed a member of the Royal Victorian Order in 1952. He was advanced to the degree of Commander of the same Order in 1970, and was made a Knight Commander in 1981.

Coats of Arms designed by Walter Verco

Mr Anthony Cronk, FSA, FRSA

Arms

See also
Herald
The Heraldry Society
Officer of Arms

References

English officers of arms
1907 births
2001 deaths
Knights Commander of the Royal Victorian Order